Jozef Baláž (born 18 June 1999) is a Slovak professional ice hockey forward. He is currently playing for HK Nitra of the Slovak Extraliga.

Baláž made his senior debut for Vítkovice during the 2017–18 Czech Extraliga season and to date he has played 43 regular season games for the team, scoring two goals and two assists. He also had loan spells in the Change Liga for HC RT Torax Poruba and AZ Havířov. On August 25, 2020, Baláž joined Draci Šumperk on loan.

International play
Baláž played for Slovakia in the 2017 IIHF World U18 Championships and the 2019 World Junior Ice Hockey Championships.

Career statistics

Regular season and playoffs

International

References

External links

1999 births
Living people
Sportspeople from Liptovský Mikuláš
Slovak ice hockey forwards
HC Vítkovice players
AZ Havířov players
HC RT Torax Poruba players
Hokej Šumperk 2003 players
HK Nitra players
HC Karlovy Vary players
Slovak expatriate ice hockey players in the Czech Republic